Howard Thomas Winter (March 17, 1929 – November 12, 2020) was an American mobster who was a boss of the Winter Hill Gang in Somerville, Massachusetts.

Early life
Winter was born in Boston, Massachusetts on March 17, 1929. He was of German and Irish descent. Winter died on November 12, 2020 at his home in Millbury, Massachusetts.

Irish Mob
Winter was the right-hand man to the originator of the gang, James "Buddy" McLean and took over the rackets, along with Joe McDonald, when McLean was killed during the Irish Mob Wars in 1965. In 1979 Winter, McDonald and other members of the Winter Hill Gang were arrested and indicted on federal "horse race fixing" charges. James "Whitey" Bulger then replaced Winter as boss of the gang.

Winter was released from prison in 1987 and relocated to St. Louis, where he was in contact with gang associate James "Gentleman Jim" Mulvey, who was a close friend of Raymond L. S. Patriarca. In 1993, he was caught dealing cocaine. When the FBI informed him that Bulger had been an informant all those years and offered Winter a deal if he would inform on Bulger, Winter refused the deal telling the FBI that Mulvey has already informed him of that and he was no "rat", despite facing another decade behind bars, which he would serve, being released from prison in July 2002.

Later life
Following his release from prison, Winter worked out of his home in Millbury as a property manager. In 2012, Winter was arrested on charges of extorting money from two people. He pled guilty and was placed on probation.

Further reading
Bloom, Robert M. Ratting: The Use and Abuse of Informants in the American Justice System. Westport, Connecticut: Greenwood Publishing Group, 2002. 
Martini, Bobby and Keratsis, Elayne. Citizen Somerville: Growing Up With The Winter Hill Gang Boston, Massachusetts: Powderhouse Press, 2010. 
Matera, Dary. FBI's Ten Most Wanted. New York: HarperCollins, 2003. 
Willis, Clint (ed.) Wise Guys: Stories of Mobsters from Jersey to Vegas. New York: Thunder's Mouth Press, 2003.

References
English, T. J. Paddy Whacked: The Untold Story of the Irish American Gangster. New York: HarperCollins, 2005. 

Notes

External links
"Profile: Howie Winter", in Howie Carr's Encyclopedia of Boston Mobsters
"A Round Up of the Usual Suspects" by John William Tuohy at www.americanmafia.com

1929 births
2020 deaths
20th-century American criminals
American male criminals
American gangsters of Irish descent
American gangsters of German descent
American crime bosses
Gangsters from Boston
People from Somerville, Massachusetts
People from West Roxbury, Boston
People from Millbury, Massachusetts
Military personnel from Massachusetts
United States Marine Corps personnel of World War II
Child soldiers in World War II
Winter Hill Gang